Alexis Miellet (born 5 May 1995 in Dijon) is a French middle-distance runner specialising in the 1500 metres. He won a silver medal at the 2017 Summer Universiade.

International competitions

Personal bests

Outdoor
400 metres – 49.92 (Chenove 2014)
800 metres – 1:45.88 (Marseille 2019)
1500 metres – 3:34.23 (Monaco 2019)
3000 metres – 8:07.65 (Dijon 2019)

References

1995 births
Living people
French male middle-distance runners
Sportspeople from Dijon
Universiade medalists in athletics (track and field)
Universiade silver medalists for France
French Athletics Championships winners
Medalists at the 2017 Summer Universiade
Athletes (track and field) at the 2018 Mediterranean Games
Mediterranean Games competitors for France
Athletes (track and field) at the 2020 Summer Olympics
Olympic athletes of France
20th-century French people
21st-century French people